José Iglesias Fernández (23 December 1926 – 12 July 2007), nicknamed Joseíto, was a Spanish football outside right and manager.

He amassed La Liga totals of 134 games and 54 goals over the course of nine seasons, namely in representation of Real Madrid, with which he appeared in 177 official matches and scored 77 goals, winning ten major titles.

Club career
Born in Zamora, Castile and León, Joseíto played for several clubs before arriving at Racing de Santander in 1949, including local Atlético Zamora. In his first season, he helped the Cantabrians promote to La Liga.

In the 1951 summer Joseíto moved to Real Madrid (two years before another player that would represent both clubs, Francisco Gento), going on to remain at the Santiago Bernabéu Stadium for the following eight years whilst appearing in nearly 200 official games. From 1955 to 1959 he won four consecutive European Cups, contributing with 11 matches and six goals in the process; however, after the arrival of Raymond Kopa, he began featuring less regularly.

Joseíto retired in 1961 at the age of nearly 35, after one-year spells in the second division with Levante UD and Rayo Vallecano. In the following decades he managed a host of clubs in all three major levels of Spanish football, being in charge of Valencia CF and Granada CF (two spells) in the top level.

International career
Joseíto gained his first and only cap for Spain on 28 December 1952, a 2–2 friendly draw with West Germany played in Madrid.

Honours
Valladolid
Tercera División: 1945–46, 1946–47

Salamanca
Tercera División: 1947–48

Racing Santander
Segunda División: 1949–50

Real Madrid
 4 La Liga: 1953–54, 1954–55, 1956–57, 1957–58
 4 European Cup: 1955–56, 1956–57, 1957–58, 1958–59
 2 Latin Cup: 1955, 1957

Death
Joseíto died in Granada, Andalusia on 12 July 2007, after suffering the second stroke in six years. He was 80 years old.

References

External links

National team data 

1926 births
2007 deaths
People from Zamora, Spain
Sportspeople from the Province of Zamora
Spanish footballers
Footballers from Castile and León
Association football wingers
La Liga players
Segunda División players
Zamora CF footballers
Real Valladolid players
UD Salamanca players
Racing de Santander players
Real Madrid CF players
Levante UD footballers
Rayo Vallecano players
Spain international footballers
Spanish football managers
La Liga managers
RC Celta de Vigo managers
CD Tenerife managers
Valencia CF managers
Granada CF managers
Córdoba CF managers
Real Murcia managers
Deportivo Alavés managers
CD Leganés managers
Deportivo de La Coruña managers
UEFA Champions League winning players